Andrew Goffman is an American actor, stand-up comic, and author/performer of the Off-Broadway one man show The Accidental Pervert.

Career

Goffman began his career as a stand-up comedian, playing New York City clubs including Carolines, Catch A Rising Star, The Comic Strip, Stand Up New York, the Boston Comedy Club, the Comedy Cellar, and Rascals. He later headlined internationally, including in Canada's renowned chain of comedy clubs, Yuk Yuks.

His intense theatrical training started with mentor JoAnna Beckson, known for her specialty in teaching comedians the art of acting. His classmates included Kevin James, Rock Reuben, Dave Chappelle, Mary Dimino, Dave Attell and Ray Romano.

Goffman made his Off-Broadway debut in the hit comedy Grandma Sylvia's Funeral, in which he played a lead role for more than a year.

He has appeared in films including The First Wives Club with Beth Midler, iMurders with William Forsythe, and The Stand-In with Kelly Ripa.

The Accidental Pervert
In 2005, Goffman wrote his one-man show, The Accidental Pervert, which had its world premiere in Times Square, New York City. It was and is directed by Charles Messina, and is currently playing at the 13th Street Rep in New York City.

In a May 2012 interview with Village Voice columnist Michael Musto, Goffman recounts some of the experiences that shaped the play's content, saying, "When I was 10, I discovered my dad's porno tapes and became obsessed with them. When I was 15, I had sex with Stacey Lititto. We called her Stacey Libido. It was good, but she didn't have an orgasm, and she didn't even know how to fake one yet!”

The Accidental Pervert is now running in over 14 countries on four different continents, and has a multitude of licensing deals by international producers, theaters, and television/film celebrities playing the role of the Pervert worldwide. It has been performed in Greenwich Village, New York City over 1,200 times.

Filmography 
 The First Wives Club (1996)
 The Stand-In (1999)
 Nights with Mary (2007)
 iMurders (2008)

References

External links 
 

Living people
Place of birth missing (living people)
Year of birth missing (living people)
American male film actors
American stand-up comedians
American male stage actors